Wilson Muñoz Brenes (born 5 February 1975) is a Costa Rican former professional footballer who played as a midfielder.

Career

Muñoz started his career with Costa Rican side Alajuelense, forming a midfield partnership with Costa Rica international Wílmer López.

In 2000, he signed for OFI in Greece.

In 2002, Muñoz signed for Saprissa, Costa Rica's most successful club, where he was known for being asked by a model to sign her buttocks.

References

External links
 

Living people
1975 births
People from Puntarenas
Costa Rican footballers
Association football midfielders
Liga FPD players
Super League Greece players
L.D. Alajuelense footballers
A.D. Turrialba players
OFI Crete F.C. players
Deportivo Saprissa players
Municipal Liberia footballers
Costa Rican expatriate footballers
Costa Rican expatriate sportspeople in Greece
Expatriate footballers in Greece